The  is a class of 1,000 ton-class PL type patrol vessels of the Japan Coast Guard (JCG).

Backgrounds 
Although these ships were excellent in security missions, they were also unsuitable for rescue missions because of their poor low-speed stability and cruising capacity.

Because their high cost, construction of this class was started under the FY2010 supplement budget as more reasonable but still versatile vessels.

Design 
Due to the demand for multi-mission capabilities, displacement hull made of steel was adopted as same as the Kunigami class. The superstructure is made of aluminium alloy. She is designed to assume the towing of a distress ship with a bollard pull of 45 tons, two funnels separated on the left and right ensure backward visibility. Because the aviation capability was not required, the helipad on the stern deck was omitted. Also no fin stabilizer was equipped, but antiroll tanks were retained since low-speed stability was required.

Based on the lesson learned from the operation of humanitarian response to the 2011 Tōhoku earthquake and tsunami, the last four ships strengthened the capacity of the fresh water generator, and additionally equipped with a water supply unit, a fuel supply unit, and a loading crane.

As a main weapon, a Bushmaster II 30 mm chain gun system with an optical director is installed.

In service 
The level of stability of this class was good, the automation was also proceeding, and it was a popular boat for the crew. However, this class was considered not to be so suitable for the security missions on the Senkaku Islands, and the Kunigami class began construction again in FY2012. This additional construction reduced costs, therefore construction of Kunigami class is continuing from FY 2013 onwards.

Ships in the class

See also
 List of Japan Coast Guard vessels and aircraft

References

Patrol vessels of the Japan Coast Guard
Patrol ship classes